Key server can mean:

 Key server (cryptographic), a server on which public keys are stored for others to use
 Key server (software licensing), a server that distributes software license keys